Lembo Saysana (born 12 February 1995) is a Laotian footballer who played as a forward for the Laotian national team and Electricite du Laos.

In February 2020, the Asian Football Confederation banned him from football for life for match manipulation.

References 

Living people
1995 births
Laotian footballers
Laotian expatriate footballers
Laotian expatriate sportspeople in Thailand
Expatriate footballers in Thailand
Laos international footballers
Association football forwards
Sportspeople involved in betting scandals
Sportspeople banned for life